Chemmumiahpet is a census town in Cuddapah district  in the state of Andhra Pradesh, India.

Demographics
 India census, Chemmumiahpet had a population of 31,416. Males constitute 51% of the population and females 49%. Chemmumiahpet has an average literacy rate of 65%, higher than the national average of 59.5%; with male literacy of 73% and female literacy of 56%. 12% of the population is under 6 years of age.

References

Villages in Kadapa district